Ryan Lian is a Singaporean actor and singer.

Career
Lian is managed by J Team productions under mm2 Entertainment.

Lian had been taking on minor roles in Mediacorp dramas for more than 15 years before he made his film debut in director Jack Neo's movie Long Long Time Ago and the sequel Long Long Time Ago 2 as Ah Long and this was the first time he was one of the main leads.

In 2017, Lian was featured in Take 2 and Ah Boys to Men 4.

Filmography

Film

Television series

Discography

Singles

References

External links
 

Living people
1985 births
Singaporean people of Hokkien descent
Singaporean people of Chinese descent
21st-century Singaporean male actors
Singaporean male film actors
Singaporean male television actors